Guetta Blaster is the second studio album by French DJ and producer David Guetta. It was released on 7 June 2004 by Virgin Records and Gum Prod.

Track listing

Charts

Weekly charts

Year-end charts

Certifications

References

2004 albums
David Guetta albums
Albums produced by David Guetta